Gudrun Gabriele Liemberger (born in Freistadt) known by her stage name GuGabriel, is an Austrian singer-songwriter and musician. She is most famous for her single "Salvation" which has peaked to number 19 on the Austrian Singles Chart.

Music career

2011: Anima(L)
On May 27, 2011 she released her debut single "Reason". On June 3, 2011 she released her debut studio album Anima(L). On November 18, 2011 she released a single called "Poor Little Joé" which was the main title song from the movie The Poor Little Matchgirl.
2012:
2004 bildete sich die Band "She Says". 2005 landete Gudrun mit"She Says - Rosegardens" einen Megahit. Das Album "She Says" war 2006 Nummer eins in den Österreichischen Albumcharts. Ausserdem erhielt Sie 2006 auch den Amadeus Award.

2012-present: Second studio album
On July 7, 2012 she released a single called "Salvation", it entered the Austrian Singles Chart at number 37 and has peaked to number 19.

Discography

Albums

Singles

References

External links
 Official website

Living people
English-language singers from Austria
Year of birth missing (living people)